The 1951 All-Ireland Minor Football Championship was the 20th staging of the All-Ireland Minor Football Championship, the Gaelic Athletic Association's premier inter-county Gaelic football tournament for boys under the age of 18.

Kerry entered the championship as defending champions, however, they were defeated by Armagh in the All-Ireland semi-final.

On 23 September 1951, Roscommon won the championship following a 2-7 to 1-5 defeat of Armagh in the All-Ireland final. This was their third All-Ireland title overall and their first in seven championship seasons.

Results

Connacht Minor Football Championship

Leinster Minor Football Championship

Munster Minor Football Championship

Ulster Minor Football Championship

All-Ireland Minor Football Championship
Semi-Finals

Final

References

final was in dec not September. Please correct.

1951
All-Ireland Minor Football Championship